Choreutis betuliperda is a moth in the family Choreutidae. It was described by Harrison Gray Dyar Jr. in 1902. It is found in North America, where it has been recorded from California and Colorado.

References

Arctiidae genus list at Butterflies and Moths of the World of the Natural History Museum

Choreutis
Moths described in 1902